Arthur Caldwell may refer to:

Arthur Caldwell (Australian footballer) (1886–1915), Australian rules footballer
Arthur Caldwell (footballer, born 1913) (1913–1989), English footballer

See also
Arthur Calwell (1896–1973), Australian politician